The Australian cricket team toured England in the 1985 season to play a six-match Test series against England. England won the series 3–1 with two matches drawn.  England therefore regained The Ashes.

Test series summary

First Test

Second Test

Third Test

Fourth Test

Fifth Test

Sixth Test

One Day Internationals (ODIs)

Australia won the Prudential Trophy 2–1.

1st ODI

2nd ODI

3rd ODI

Australian squad
Australia had endured a turbulent summer during the 1984–85 season, which included the resignation of their captain Kim Hughes and consistent defeats at the hands of the West Indian cricket side. However, there were some encouraging signs, such as the consistent form of Kepler Wessels, the re-emergence of Andrew Hilditch as a test batsman, the discovery of an exciting new pace prospect in Craig McDermott and improved spin bowling stocks, led by Bob Holland.

Original squad
The original squad selected were as follows:
Batsmen - Allan Border (captain), Andrew Hilditch (vice captain), David Boon, Greg Ritchie, Dirk Wellham, Kepler Wessels, Graeme Wood
Fast bowlers - Terry Alderman, Geoff Lawson, Craig McDermott, Rod McCurdy
Spinners - Murray Bennett, Bob Holland, Greg Matthews
Wicketkeepers - Wayne Phillips, Steve Rixon
All-rounders - Simon O'Donnell

"Rebel tours" of South Africa
However it was revealed prior to leaving for England that several of the cricketers had signed to play cricket in South Africa over the 1985–86 and 1986–87 seasons, including Alderman, Wellham, Wood, McCurdy, Phillips, Bennett and Rixon. Although these contracts did not start until after the Ashes, the Australian Cricket Board were reluctant to allow these players to go on the tour.

Wellham, Phillips and Wood were then all offered inducements by Kerry Packer, who owned TV rights to the game, not to go to South Africa, and Bennett changed his mind. Alderman, McCurdy and Rixon stuck by their original decisions, and were ruled ineligible to tour. They were replaced by Carl Rackemann, John Maguire and Ray Phillips.  Rackemann and McGuire then revealed that they too had signed to tour South Africa, and were replaced by David Gilbert and Jeff Thomson.

The remaining Australian team originally elected to tour without Wellham, Phillips and Wood but eventually changed their mind after a team meeting.

Series
Australia performed reasonably well in the early tour games, the highlight being Allan Border scoring four centuries in consecutive first class games. Jeff Thomson leapt into test consideration after taking eight wickets against Somerset. David Boon, Greg Ritchie and Wayne Phillips also scored well in early games, and Bob Holland took a number of wickets. Simon O'Donnell's century against the MCC saw him come into consideration as an all rounder.

Australia won the one day series 2–1. They then drew a game against Leicestershire in which David Gower scored a century, taking heavy toll off Bob Holland's bowling, while Jeff Thomson took five wickets.

This saw Thomson preferred over Holland in Australia's team for the first test. Simon O'Donnell was picked as the fourth bowler in support of McDermott, Lawson and Thomson, despite a noticeable lack of success with the ball on the tour until that date. The rest of the team consisted of Wood, Hilditch, Wessels, Border, Boon, Ritchie and Phillips. Australia lost the first by five wickets.

Holland then took five wickets in a game against Hampshire and came into the test side in place of Thomson for the second test. Australia won this by four wickets, due mostly to Allan Border's scores of 196 and 41 not out, and five wicket hauls to McDermott and Holland.

Australia kept the same side for the third test, which ended in a heavy scoring draw. In order to boost the bowling, the injured Graeme Wood was replaced by all rounder Greg Matthews in the fourth test, where Australia managed to escape with a draw due to a second innings century from Allan Border.

For the fifth test Wood returned and Matthews was dropped. However Australia decided to boost the bowling by dropping Boon for Jeff Thomson. Australia lost the game by an innings.

Australia dropped O'Donnell for the sixth and final test, bringing in Dirk Wellham instead, and replacing Holland with Murray Bennett and Jeff Thomson with Gilbert. Australia lost this game by an innings as well.

References

External sources
Australia in British Isles 1985
Cricinfo Monthly article on the tour
Guardian article on the tour

Annual reviews
 Playfair Cricket Annual 1986
 Wisden Cricketers' Almanack 1986

1985 in Australian cricket
Cricket season
1985
International cricket competitions from 1980–81 to 1985
1985